Ladzhanuri Hydro Power Plant or Lajanuri Hydro Power Plant is a large power plant in Georgia with four turbines, each with a nominal capacity of 29 MW, with a total capacity of 116 MW.

See also

 List of power stations in Georgia (country)
 Energy in Georgia (country)

References

Hydroelectric power stations in Georgia (country)